Álvaro Rivero Sánchez (born 17 April 1997) is a Spanish professional footballer.

Early life
Rivero was born in Madrid, and began playing organised football in 2003 with local club Lugo Fuenlabrada.

Club career

Real Madrid
In 2005, Rivero joined the academy system of Real Madrid. On 7 December 2014, he made his senior debut with Real Madrid C in the Tercera División in a match against Atlético Madrid C. On 1 March 2015, he scored his first senior goal for the C team in a match against Internacional de Madrid. He made a total of nine appearances for the C team that season, scoring one goal.

In the 2015–16 season, Rivero played for Real Madrid's U19 side in the UEFA Youth League, scoring two goals in four continental appearances.

York United
On 27 July 2020, Rivero signed with Canadian Premier League side York9, which became known as York United prior to the 2021 season. He made his debut on August 15 against Atlético Ottawa. At the end of the 2021 CPL season, York announced they had declined Rivero's contract option, ending his time at the club after two seasons.

Career statistics

References

External links
 

1997 births
Living people
Association football forwards
Spanish footballers
Footballers from Madrid
Spanish expatriate footballers
Expatriate soccer players in Canada
Spanish expatriate sportspeople in Canada
Real Madrid C footballers
Rayo Vallecano B players
Internacional de Madrid players
UD Las Palmas Atlético players
Getafe CF B players
CD Leganés B players
York United FC players
CD Gerena players
Tercera División players
Segunda División B players
Canadian Premier League players